Crawford School of Public Policy is a research-intensive policy school within the ANU College of Asia and the Pacific at The Australian National University which focuses on Australia and the Asia-Pacific region. The school was named after Sir John Crawford, and its current director is Professor Helen Sullivan.
The Crawford School has disciplinary and interdisciplinary expertise in public policy, economics, political science, national security, aid, development, and environmental management.

The JG Crawford Building
In December 2009, the school moved to a new mini-campus overlooking Lake Burley Griffin. The new school building is located on Acton Peninsula adjacent to Old Canberra House and the WEH Stanner building.
The new building designed by Tanner Architects links the two existing buildings to provide consolidated accommodation for staff and students of the school, surrounding a courtyard forming a mini-campus. A new extension to the Crawford School, the GJ Yeend Wing Building, was opened by Australian Prime Minister Julia Gillard on 23 January 2013.

Research Centres at Crawford 

Within Crawford School, academics have clustered their research into centres. These organized research units are funded independently through grants, consultancies or other contracts.

Australia-Japan Research Centre (AJRC) 
The Australia-Japan Research Centre (AJRC) conducts research to explore and improve understanding of the economies and economic policy processes in Australia and Japan and both countries’ strategic interests in the Asia-Pacific economy. It's policy-oriented areas of interest cover developments in regional economic cooperation and integration and encompass research on trade, finance, macroeconomics and structural and regulatory reform, as well as international economic relations.

Professor Jenny Corbett was appointed AJRC Executive Director in August 2004.

Australian Centre for Biosecurity and Environmental Economics (ACBEE) 
The Australian Centre for Biosecurity and Environmental Economics (ACBEE) is an organized research unit of the Crawford School of Public Policy at the Australian National University, and the Foundation Director is Professor Tom Kompas.

The ACBEE's mission is to lead Australia and the region in biosecurity and environmental economics research, with an emphasis on policy applications. Their specialty is economic approaches to protecting the environment and plant, animal and human health from invasive species. They also provide broad mastery in applied research on environmental economics and natural resource management. ACBEE maintains a central focus on engaging with and assisting the public policy process.

Centre for Applied Macroeconomic Analysis (CAMA)
The Centre for Applied Macroeconomic Analysis (CAMA) is located in the Crawford School of Public Policy at the Australian National University and was established in 2003 to bring together economists working on applied macroeconomic and financial market issues throughout Australia and across the globe. CAMA's objectives are to advance research and post-graduate training in applied macroeconomic and financial issues.

CAMA was founded by current director Professor Warwick McKibbin. The current CAMA deputy director is Professor Ippei Fujiwara. Former directors include Professor Shaun Vahey, and deputy directors include Professor Mardi Dungey, Professor Heather Anderson and Professor Renee Fry.

Centre for Climate Economics and Policy (CCEP) 
The Centre for Climate Economics and Policy (CCEP) aims to provide insights on the economics of climate change and its implications for public policy. This includes the analysis of cutting greenhouse gas emissions and the anthropogenic factors driving climate change, as well as adaptation to climate change impacts. The focus is on Australia and the countries of the Asia-Pacific region. CCEP is a network of researchers who are experts in many different aspects of climate change economics and policy analysis who share an active interest in informing public policy. Associate Professor Frank Jotzo is the director of the centre.

Centre for Water Economics, Environment and Policy (CWEEP) 

The goal of the Centre of Water Economics, Environment and Policy (CWEEP) is to provide technical and public policy insights into managing water under climate variability and climate change, urban water supply and demand management, water markets, water pricing, trans-boundary water governance, and water management practices that promote environmental sustainability. Quentin Grafton is the director of CWEEP.

Children's Policy Centre (CPC) 
The Children's Policy Centre (CPC) undertakes inter-disciplinary research on issues relating to children's policy. The centre aims to contribute to both policy and scholarship, focusing on children's participation; child protection; and overcoming child poverty and disadvantage. Associate Professor Sharon Bessell is the director of the centre.

China Economy and Business Program (CEBP) 
The China Economy and Business Program (CEBP) is home to the strongest concentration of research outside China on the Chinese economy. The program is a joint undertaking of the Crawford School and the Research School of Pacific and Asian Studies with the program administered by the Crawford School. CEBP coordinates projects into relevant external communities like the research of ANU-based scholars on the Chinese economy and business.

The CEBP incorporates skills in economic and policy analysis to identify the most important trends in China's economic development and assess their implications. The program draws on proficiency from across the ANU and links to an extensive network of the region's most influential specialists on China. Associate Professor Ligang Song is the director of CEBP.

Development Policy Centre (DPC) 

The Development Policy Centre (DPC) is an aid and development policy think tank. The DPC emerged at the time of unprecedented growth in the Australian aid program. It researches and promotes discussion of aid effectiveness, the Pacific Islands (including Papua New Guinea), and development policy. The centre hosts events and runs both the blog Devpol Blog that is updated frequently, and a website that contains regularly updated information on the centre, discussion papers, policy briefs and reports.

The Development Policy Centre is directed by Professor Stephen Howes.

East Asian Bureau of Economic Research (EABER) 
The Crawford School houses both the secretariats for the East Asia Forum (EAF) and the East Asian Bureau of Economic Research (EABER). The EAF brings together Australia's expertise on East Asia, publishing 2 articles daily and releasing a quarterly magazine, the East Asia Forum Quarterly (EAFQ). EABER works on building research capacity, and brings together the top economic research institutes and researchers in the region. Together, they promote dialogue and research on the most important economic, political and other issues in the region. In addition, EABER organizes several high-level conferences, including the Pacific Trade and Development (PAFTAD) conference series.

EABER and EAF were officially launched in Australia by the then treasurer, Peter Costello, in the Menzies Library at the ANU in Canberra on the 17th of October in 2007. EABER was launched internationally by Indonesia's Coordinating Minister for Economic Affairs, Boediono, in Bogor in 2005.

EABER is directed by Emeritus Professor Peter Drysdale.

Social Policy Institute (SPI) 
The Social Policy Institute (SPI) launched in June 2013 and takes on multi-disciplinary and collaborative research on social policy issues in Australia and internationally. It aims to inform and contribute to policy-making processes and foster networks and promote collaboration between researchers, policy makers and practitioners and the community on social policy issues.

The director of the centre is Professor Peter Whiteford.

Tax and Transfer Policy Institute (TTPI) 
The Tax and Transfer Policy Institute (TTPI) was established at Crawford School in 2013, with a start-up endowment from the Australian Treasury. The mission of the institute is to manage and promote independent research and policy analysis relevant to the tax and transfer system in Australia and internationally.

The establishment of the institute implemented Recommendation 134 of the Review of Australia's Future Tax System (2009). In February 2014, Professor Miranda Stewart was appointed as the inaugural director of the institute, and Dr. John Hewson AM was appointed as the inaugural professor and chair.

The TTPI conducts research and policy analysis (in-house and with partners), hosts events and engages in policy and public debate. Through its research and education programs, the institute aims to build tax and transfer capability across a range of disciplines.

Asia and the Pacific Policy Studies (APPST) 
The Asia and the Pacific Policy Studies (APPST) is the journal of Crawford School. It is a peer-reviewed journal that targets research in policy studies in Australia, Asia and the Pacific.

The journal has funding support from the Australian Department of Foreign Affairs and Trade and is published online three times a year by Wiley. It is open-access, meaning all papers are freely available to read online and download.

Asia and the Pacific Policy Society (APPSO) 
The Asia and the Pacific Policy Society (APPSO) is a community of scholars, policymakers, researchers, students and the policy-engaged public. It is an international association linking people engaged in public policy working across academic disciplines in the region. The society is based in Crawford School of Public Policy, The society was launched in July 2012 by the then Shadow Communications Minister, Malcolm Turnbull.

The society supports the journal, Asia and the Pacific Policy Studies, and works to position academic research in the discussion of public policy in the region. The Membership is free and a conference is held each year.

The society's APPSO Policy Forum is a public policy website specializing in Asia and the Pacific. Policyforum.net publishes essays, opinions and analysis on public policy challenge throughout the region and the world. Published authors include distinguished academics, former prime ministers, people employed by NGOs and postgraduate students.

In 2016 Policy Forum launched a podcast Policy Forum Pod, which is co-presented by Martyn Pearce and Sharron Bessell.

Advance 
Advance is Crawford School's magazine. Produced four times a year, the magazine features contributions from Crawford School staff and students, ANU Public Policy Fellows and public policy-engaged researchers. It is published with the support of the APPSO.

Notable personnel
 Dr John Hewson AM, former Leader of the Opposition, economist and director of Macquarie Bank
Frank Jotzo, environmental economist (CCEP)

References

External links
 https://crawford.anu.edu.au/

Australian National University